Juan Carlos Dante Gullo (8 June 1947 – 3 May 2019) was an Argentine sociologist and politician, who was a member of the Chamber of Deputies (2007–2011) and the Buenos Aires City Legislature (2011–2015).

References

1947 births
2019 deaths
21st-century Argentine politicians
Members of the Argentine Chamber of Deputies elected in Buenos Aires
Members of the Buenos Aires City Legislature
Argentine sociologists